Dark Thane is a fantasy novel in the setting of Dragonlance, based on the campaign setting for the Dungeons & Dragons fantasy role-playing game. It was written by Jeff Crook. It is volume three of the six volume book series The Age of Mortals. It is set in the year 422 AC (After Cataclysm), also known as 39 SC (Second Cataclysm).

Plot introduction
After a series of ugly battles and incidents, the dwarven community becomes increasingly isolationist in its city under the mountains. Unfortunately dark magic, backstabbings, betrayal and power grabs threaten to destroy the already destabilized dwarf society.

Explanation of the novel's title
A Thane is a ruler of a dwarven faction.

Characters in "Dark Thane"
Tarn Bellowgranite
Mog Bonecutter
Crystal Heathstone
Zen     
Ferro Dunskull
Glint Ettinhammer
Tor Bellowgranite

Release details
2003, USA. Wizards of the Coast,, Pub date November 2003, Paperback

Reception

References

External links
Dark Thane at Wizards of the Coast.com
Zipped sample chapter from Wizards of the Coast.com

2003 American novels

American fantasy novels
Dragonlance novels
The Age of Mortals series novels